What Will You Be? is a children's book by Rudolph Giuliani and author/illustrator Kristin Doney.

References

External links
Illustrator/Author, Kristin Doney website

1996 children's books
American picture books